The Iranian Tobacco Company (ITC) was established in Iran in 1928 to achieve improvement and progress in the global tobacco industry.

This company is one of the most important and largest tobacco production companies in Iran.

Currently, the CEO of this company is Mohammad sheikhan n

ITC's brands include Bahman, Tir, Farvardin, 57, Homa, Zar, Kish, Caspian, Marlleak, Zika , T4 , Oshno, 98 and 68.

Iranian Original tobaccoac is a well known brand and is imported by countries in the Persian Gulf, Lebanon, Syria and Iraq.

The tobacco farmed in Iran varies from eastern types like Basma and Tiklak, semi-eastern like Trabozan and western like Virginia and Burley. It is exported to many countries in Europe and the Near East.

See also
Healthcare in Iran
Smoking in Iran

References

External links
 Iranian Tobacco Company website 
 

Tobacco companies of Iran
Companies based in Tehran
Ministry of Industry, Mine and Trade (Iran)